The 2005 Tostitos Fiesta Bowl, played on January 1, 2005, was the 34th edition of the Fiesta Bowl. The game was played between Utah and Pittsburgh, in front of 73,519 fans. It is notable for being the first BCS game to feature a team from a BCS non-AQ conference.

Going into the game, Utah had been ranked in the Top 10 for 8 consecutive weeks. Pittsburgh was 8–3 and the Big East Conference champion. Utah raced to a 28–0 lead and held on for a convincing 35–7 win.  Alex Smith completed 29 of 37 passes for 328 yards and 4 touchdowns, earning the Fiesta Bowl MVP. Paris Warren was Smith's go-to man during the game, as he caught a Fiesta Bowl record 15 passes for 198 yards and 2 touchdowns.

See also
 List of historically significant college football games

References

Fiesta Bowl
Fiesta Bowl
Pittsburgh Panthers football bowl games
Utah Utes football bowl games
2005 in sports in Arizona
January 2005 sports events in the United States